The following is a list of characters that first appeared in the BBC soap opera EastEnders in 2018, by order of first appearance. All characters are introduced by the show's executive consultant, John Yorke. Madhav Sharma and Indira Joshi made their first appearances in January as Arshad Ahmed and Mariam Ahmed, the uncle and aunt of Masood Ahmed (Nitin Ganatra). Halfway (Tony Clay), a friend of the Carter family, Ciara Maguire (Denise McCormack), the former wife of Aidan Maguire (Patrick Bergin), and Daisy (Amelie Smith), one of Arshad and Mariam's foster children, also debuted in January. Dan and Ashley (Ifan Meredith and Ashley Cook), Daisy's adoptive parents, Hunter Owen, the son of Mel Owen (Tamzin Outhwaite) and her dead husband Steve (Martin Kemp), Hayley Slater (Katie Jarvis), the cousin of Stacey Fowler (Lacey Turner), and Georgi (Holly Donovan) first appear in February. Mitch Baker (Roger Griffiths), Keegan Baker's (Zack Morris) father, and Harley, a foster child of Mariam and Arshad, debuts in March. Judith Thompson (Emma Fielding), the daughter of Ted Murray (Christopher Timothy) and Joyce Murray (Maggie Steed), and Harley's parents, Bijan (Jonas Khan) and Chloe (Lauren Fitzpatrick), appear in April. Henry (Andrew Alexander) also debuts in April. May sees the introductions of Stuart Highway (Ricky Champ), Halfway's brother, Umar Kazemi (Selva Rasalingam), the father of Kush Kazemi (Davood Ghadami) and Shakil Kazemi (Shaheen Jafargholi), and Darius Kazemi (Ash Rizi), Kush and Shakil's brother. Amal Hussain (Natasha Jayetileke) appears in June, while Jessica Jones (Tara Lee) made her first appearance in July. Adam Bateman (Stephen Rahman-Hughes) joins the cast in August and Marky (Niall O'Mara) also appears during the month. Ray Kelly (Sean Mahon), Zara Highway (Faye Daveney) and Bev Slater (Ashley McGuire) all debuted in September. Cherry Slater, the daughter of Hayley and Alfie Moon (Shane Richie), debuted in October and in November, Evie Steele (Sophia Capasso) made her first appearance.

Arshad Ahmed

Arshad Ahmed, played by Madhav Sharma, first appears in the episode broadcast on 1 January 2018, alongside his wife Mariam Ahmed (Indira Joshi). Arshad is the uncle of established character Masood Ahmed (Nitin Ganatra). Arshad's final scenes aired on 1 November 2019.

Masood drives Mariam and Arshad to Albert Square so they can move into number 41, which he owns. They are horrified to witness an armed robbery and shooting, and Mariam insists that they leave, so Masood and Arshad start taking things back to the van but are confused when Mariam disappears and then insists on staying. Masood attempts to ask Arshad and Mariam about setting a rent payment date, and Arshad lends Masood money. Mariam and Arshad's foster daughter, Daisy (Amelie Smith), moves in. Masood looks after her but when he leaves the room, she disappears. The police are contacted, and in the search for Daisy, Masood's ice cream van is found and he is forced to reveal his lack of success to his family. Ian Beale (Adam Woodyatt) finds Daisy and returns her to the Ahmeds, but delays taking her back because Masood joked to him that Arshad and Mariam religiously brainwash children. The police are unimpressed and a report has to be filed about Daisy's disappearance, which Masood worries will harm his family's fostering. Masood then moves back into his own home but Arshad insists that he pays them rent, so he is outraged that they will essentially be living there rent-free. Masood gets a job in The Vic but tells his family that he is an estate agent. Arshad soon finds out that Masood is working in the Vic but promises not to tell Mariam. When Daisy is due to be adopted by Dan and Ashley (Ifan Meredith and Ashley Cook), Mariam admits to Arshad that she struggles when their foster children leave, and she wants to give up fostering. Daisy is adopted and Arshad and Mariam wonder what they will do next. Arshad witnesses an argument between Martin Fowler (James Bye) and Stacey Fowler (Lacey Turner) in front of their children and tells them off for their "child abuse". Mariam and Arshad then agree to emergency foster a two-year-old child who has been physically abused. They also foster a baby, Harley, whose mother is a heroin addict. Arshad struggles to settle him but soon realises that grime music works. Harley is tracked down by his birth parents, Bijan and Chloe (Jonas Khan and Lauren Fitzpatrick), and Arshad learns of their identity from social services when Bijan breaks in to vandalise their CCTV. Harley is kidnapped by Bijan, who hides out in the Ahmeds' house, and Chloe, but he is returned to the Ahmeds after persuasion from Rainie Branning (Tanya Franks).

When Honey Mitchell (Emma Barton) has toothache and unable to get an appointment with a dentist, Arshad arranges for Honey to see his foster son Adam Bateman (Stephen Rahman-Hughes) at a dental practice. After the appointment, Adam and Honey begin dating and Arshad suggests that Adam bring Honey and her children over for lunch one day to meet him and Miriam. However, Adam cheats on Honey with Arshad's and Miriam's granddaughter Habiba Ahmed (Rukku Nahar) and Honey's ex-husband Billy Mitchell (Perry Fenwick) witnesses them kissing and tells Arshad and Miriam. Despite Arshad proclaiming that Billy is lying and letting his emotions over the end of his marriage interfere with the relationship, both he and Miriam are shaken by the revelation, especially as Habiba has had a crush on Adam before. Miriam suggests that Arshad ignore it and assures him that she will deal with Habiba personally. After Honey provides Arshad and Mariam with travel vouchers, the pair leave Walford for a pilgrimage to Pakistan.

On 3 October 2017, it was announced that Ganatra had reprised his role, having departed the serial in 2016. It was also confirmed that members of the character's family would be introduced. The character and Sharma's casting was announced on 15 November. Arshad and Mariam are foster carers and Arshad is billed as "jovial and with an air of mischief". Arshad and Mariam move to Albert Square, the show's setting, to rent Masood's house after agreeing it will allow them more room for their foster care. A show spokesperson said that the character's introduction is "certainly not the hassle free move they were expecting", adding that they will become embroiled in other character's drama instantly. Sharma expressed his delight at joining the show's cast and playing Arshad. John Yorke, the show's executive consultant, stated he was overjoyed to introduce more characters from Masood's family and promised "some incredibly challenging, fun and exciting stories ahead" for them. He also confirmed that more members of the family would be introduced. Following the characters' arrival, Daisy, one of their foster children, is introduced. Daisy goes missing upon her arrival and a "frantic search" is launched that could provide a "potentially devastating setback" for Arshad and Mariam.

Mariam Ahmed

Mariam Ahmed, played by Indira Joshi, first appears in the episode broadcast on 1 January 2018, alongside her husband Arshad Ahmed (Madhav Sharma). Mariam is the aunt of established character Masood Ahmed (Nitin Ganatra). Mariam's final scenes aired on 1 November 2019.

Masood drives Mariam and Arshad to Albert Square so they can move into number 41, which he owns. While driving there, Masood introduces them to Mick Carter (Danny Dyer), although he is occupied with a planned robbery and asks them to leave. Mariam and Arshad are horrified to witness the robbery and Mick being shot back in Albert Square, and Mariam insists that they leave. However, Mariam, a retired nurse, sees Linda Carter (Kellie Bright), Mick's wife, outside The Queen Victoria pub and treats Mick, who is refusing to go to hospital. Mariam then decides to stay. Mariam and Arshad's foster daughter, Daisy (Amelie Smith), arrives with her social worker and moves in. Masood looks after her but she goes missing when he leaves the room. The police are contacted, and in the search for Daisy, Masood's ice cream van is found and he is forced to reveal his lack of success to his family. Ian Beale (Adam Woodyatt) finds Daisy and returns her to the Ahmeds, but delays taking her back because Masood joked to him that Arshad and Mariam religiously brainwash children. The police are unimpressed and a report has to be filed about Daisy's disappearance, which Masood worries will harm his family's fostering. Masood then moves back into his own home but Arshad insists that he pays them rent, so he is outraged that they will essentially be living there rent-free. Masood gets a job in The Vic but tells his family that he is an estate agent. The truth soon emerges and Masood takes a job in the chip shop, where Robbie Jackson (Dean Gaffney) accidentally eats samosas made for Masood by Mariam. Masood tells Robbie he made them and Robbie asks him to make more, so Masood steals Mariam's recipe. When she catches him cooking, he tells her he has a date and is meeting the woman's family, so she cooks the samosas for him but she later catches Masood and Robbie referring to them as Masood's samosas. Masood then agrees to meet Noor (Goldy Notay) to keep Mariam happy, and after their date, he tells Mariam that he told Noor the truth about his life and Mariam offers to teach Masood her family recipes.

When Daisy is due to be adopted by Dan and Ashley (Ifan Meredith and Ashley Cook), Mariam admits to Arshad that she struggles when their foster children leave and she wants to give up fostering. Daisy is adopted and they wonder what to do if they do not foster. However, they agree to emergency foster a two-year-old child who has been physically abused. They also foster a baby, Harley, whose mother is a heroin addict.

When Honey Mitchell (Emma Barton) has toothache and unable to get an appointment with a dentist, Arshad arranges for Honey to see his foster son Adam Bateman (Stephen Rahman-Hughes) at a dental practise. After the appointment, Adam and Honey begin dating and Arshad suggests that Adam bring Honey and her children over for lunch one day to meet him and Miriam. However, Adam cheats on Honey with Arshad's and Miriam's granddaughter Habiba Ahmed (Rukku Nahar) and Honey's ex-husband Billy Mitchell (Perry Fenwick) witnesses them kissing and tells Arshad and Miriam. Despite Arshad proclaiming that Billy is lying and letting his emotions over the end of his marriage interfere with the relationship, both he and Miriam are shaken by the revelation, especially as Habiba has had a crush on Adam before. Miriam suggests that Arshad ignore it and assures him that she will deal with Habiba personally. Suspecting Habiba of having romantic plans with Adam, Miriam places her phone in the kitchen and teases Habiba about finding a man before pointing her to the kitchen, which allows Miriam to secretly see the text Habiba receives from Adam cancelling the plans, confirming her suspicions. Miriam then goes to Habiba's and her sister Iqra Ahmed's (Priya Davdra) restaurant where Adam and Honey are having their last-minute date and, without letting on what she knows, she talks to Iqra, who is annoyed by Iqra's constant absence, and later Adam and Honey, about helping Habiba find a potential husband. After Honey provides Mariam and Ahmed with travel vouchers, the pair leave Walford for a pilgrimage to Pakistan.

On 3 October 2017, it was announced that Ganatra had reprised his role, having departed the serial in 2016. It was also confirmed that members of the character's family would be introduced. The character and Joshi's casting was announced on 15 November. Mariam and Arshad are foster carers and Mariam is billed as a "fierce but warm" character who will become integrated within the community. Mariam and Arshad move to Albert Square, the show's setting, to rent Masood's house after agreeing it will allow them more room for their foster care. A show spokesperson said that the character's introduction is "certainly not the hassle free move they were expecting", adding that they will become embroiled in other character's drama instantly. Joshi expressed her delight at joining the show's cast and said she was "looking forward" to working with Sharma and Ganatra. John Yorke, the show's executive consultant, stated he was overjoyed to introduce more characters from Masood's family and promised "some incredibly challenging, fun and exciting stories ahead" for them. He also confirmed that more members of the family would be introduced. Following the characters' arrival, Daisy, one of their foster children, is introduced. Daisy goes missing upon her arrival and a "frantic search" is launched that could provide a "potentially devastating setback" for Arshad and Mariam.

After her first few episodes, Inside Soap warmed to Mariam and looked forward to more scenes including the character. Reporter Gary Gillatt said that Mariam has "tons of charisma".

Callum "Halfway" Highway

Callum "Halfway" Highway, played by Tony Clay, first appears in the episode broadcast on 1 January 2018. Halfway is introduced as a friend of the Carter family and a love interest for Whitney Carter (Shona McGarty). The character's introduction was not publicised beforehand. Halfway is a comedic character who is jovial, dopey and "happy-go-lucky". Halfway's initial stint on the show focuses on his relationship with the Carter family and establishing a relationship with Whitney. The actor was only contracted for two months and Halfway departs in the episode first broadcast in the United Kingdom on 16 February 2018. Afterwards, Clay was invited back to reprise his role and Halfway returns two months later after serving in the Army. His experience in the Army and his relationship with Whitney are explored upon his return. Producers introduced Halfway's brother, Stuart Highway (Ricky Champ), following his return. Halfway and Stuart's relationship is portrayed as dark and Clay thought Stuart's introduction added another dimension to his character.

Ciara Maguire

Ciara Maguire, played by Denise McCormack, first appears in the episode broadcast on 2 January 2018. She is the former wife of Aidan Maguire (Patrick Bergin).

Ciara arrives following a robbery, and meets DCI Alsworth (Nik Drake) at the scene of the crime, telling him she staged the robbery as part of security training, and convinces Alsworth, who recognises her, to drop the investigation. Ciara sees a discarded cigar and realises Aidan was involved, and then calls her sister-in-law Mel Owen (Tamzin Outhwaite), telling her to pack a bag and come back to her old home. Ciara meets him at the funeral parlour, out of which he is doing business, and says she has worked out that he was involved. After Ciara leaves, Aidan tells Phil Mitchell (Steve McFadden) that he is taking back from Ciara what she took from him. Later, Ciara demands a share of the money that Aidan stole in exchange for not informing the police, and he gives her a key. When Ciara goes to meet Aidan at the address, he is not there, so she returns to the funeral parlour and meets Honey Mitchell (Emma Barton), who thinks she is a customer and takes her to The Queen Victoria public house to wait. Ciara overhears Honey on the phone to Billy Mitchell (Perry Fenwick) and works out that Aidan is at a church with Billy, so calls Aidan saying she knows where he is, even though does not, which causes Aidan to run when he hears police sirens.

Mel returns to Walford and works out that Ben Mitchell (Harry Reid) has Ciara's money, so calls her and follows Ben to the Port of Dover where she tries to get Ben to return the money as he could be in danger, but he refuses and he arrives in France; Ciara watches him. Mel later meets Ciara in a café and it is revealed that Ciara is keeping Mel's son, Hunter Owen (Charlie Winter), away from her and Mel asks where he is as they had a deal, but Ciara says that Ben did not have the money, so Mel starts to search for the money back in Walford. When Mel suspects Phil has the money, Sharon Mitchell (Letitia Dean) admits to Mel that she took it. Sharon offers Mel a share of the money in exchange for telling Ciara they cannot find it, to which Mel agrees but Ciara does not believe what they say. Ciara makes threats towards Sharon's son, Dennis Rickman (Bleu Landau), having obtained his mobile number, and threatens to tell Hunter the truth about his father, Steve Owen (Martin Kemp). Mel immediately tells Ciara that Sharon has the money, but Ciara reveals that Mel told her as soon as Sharon admitted it. Mel hands over the money to Ciara and Mel is reunited with Hunter. When Ciara discovers she does not have all the money, she tells Hunter that Steve died in a car explosion, not a heart attack as Mel claimed and was a villain who killed Saskia Duncan (Deborah Sheridan-Taylor).

On 2 January 2018, McCormack announced her casting in the show. David Brown of Radio Times suspected that Ciara would share a connection with Aidan as they share a surname. It was later confirmed that Ciara is the former wife of Aidan and they are both involved in criminal plans. The character is billed as "no-nonsense". Daniel Kilkelly of Digital Spy questioned whether she was also connected to returning character Mel Owen (Tamzin Outhwaite). McCormack confirmed she would only be in EastEnders for a short stint, but said she is grateful for the part and working on the show is "great".

Apostolos Papadopolous

Apostolos Papadopolous, played by Tarrick Benham, originally appeared from 8 to 12 January 2018. Since 12 April 2021, the character has appeared on a recurring basis.

Apostolos is the son of Andonis Papadopolous and new owner of the launderette. Karen Taylor (Lorraine Stanley) sees him in the launderette and assumes he is an asylum seeker and tells him to go home, to which he reveals he is from Hampstead and throws her out after she asks for a job. However, Karen later phones him and puts on a posh accent to secure an interview the next day. He recognises her and is angry but she convinces him that she is the right person for the job. However, Karen discovers that Apostolos is still interviewing for the job, and he tells her that he did not offer her the job. Masood Ahmed (Nitin Ganatra) also applies for the job and Apostolos asks them to each clean half of the launderette, saying he will offer it to whoever does the best job. They argue and spill bleach, but later Masood says he was to blame so Apostolos offers Karen the job but only because an employment agency failed to send anyone. Three years later, Apostolos sacks Karen because he cannot afford to keep her on. He later offers Karen a financial arrangement. Karen assumes he means paying her to sleep with him, and confronts him about it publicly. Disgusted, Apostolos reveals that it was actually an extended redundancy package, which he then refuses to give her before leaving. He later appears again the following month when Karen is arrested for smashing up the laundrette and he gives her a job back when the residents intervene. 

After the character appeared, Inside Soap said he should continue to appear, saying he should "ensure that Walford launderette runs like clockwork. Never mind cleaning our sheets—he can help get them dirty."

Daisy

Daisy, played by Amelie Smith, first appears in the episode broadcast on 9 January 2018. She is a foster child of Arshad Ahmed (Madhav Sharma) and Mariam Ahmed (Indira Joshi). In November 2017, it was announced that foster carers Mariam Ahmed and Arshad Ahmed would be introduced to the serial. Daisy is introduced as their foster child who goes missing following her arrival. When she is realised to be missing, a "frantic search" is launched that could be a "potentially devastating setback" for Arshad and Mariam. When Daisy is to be adopted, Mariam is "worried" for Daisy due to her "struggling" potential adoptive parents. Mariam is reassured Daisy will have "great parents", though saying an "emotional goodbye" to Daisy makes Mariam and Arshad question whether to give up fostering. Daisy appears in six episodes, departing in the episode broadcast on 9 February. The following year, Smith reprised the role for a cameo appearance and Daisy appeared in the episode broadcast on 1 November 2019, as part of Arshad and Mariam's departure from the series.

Six-year-old Daisy arrives with her social worker to Arshad and Mariam's house. Arshad and Mariam's nephew, Masood Ahmed (Nitin Ganatra), looks after her but he struggles to bond with her. When he leaves the room, she goes missing. The police are contacted and residents help search for her. Ian Beale (Adam Woodyatt) finds Daisy in his garden and hesitantly returns her to the Ahmeds due to Masood fooling Ian into believing that they religiously brainwash children. PC Anna Heckley (Harriet Green) informs the family she will have to file a report about Daisy's disappearance, and Masood worries that it will damage his family's fostering. Mariam watches a video from Daisy's potential adoptive fathers, Dan and Ashley (Ifan Meredith and Ashley Cook), and is unsure if they should be the ones to bring up Daisy. Dan and Ashley have dinner with the Ahmeds and Ashley admits to Arshad that Daisy could not settle during her stay with them, but Arshad reminds him of Daisy's past and her difficulty in trusting adults. Mariam decides to contact social services. Dan and Ashley visit the Ahmeds again with social worker Viktoria (Cathy Walker), who talks to Ashley about concerns he has raised. Ashley is committed to Daisy, but feels that as he works from home and Dan does not, he will be looking after her when she is off school, but Dan reassures Ashley that he will have his support and will take time off work. Mariam and Arshad allow Daisy to paint their gate to remember her. On the morning of Daisy's leaving, she screams and spits at Mariam but Mariam calms her down. Daisy leaves when Dan and Ashley collect her.

Dan and Ashley

Dan, played by Ifan Meredith, and Ashley, played by Ashley Cook, are the adoptive parents of Daisy (Amelie Smith), a child in the foster care of Arshad Ahmed (Madhav Sharma) and Mariam Ahmed (Indira Joshi). Their adoption of Daisy makes Arshad and Mariam reconsider fostering in the future. The characters appear in three episodes from 5 February to 9 February 2018. The following year, Cook reprised the role for a cameo appearance and Ashley appeared in the episode broadcast on 1 November 2019, as part of Arshad and Mariam's departure from the series.

Dan and Ashley first appear when they have dinner with Arshad and Mariam after having Daisy stay with them for a night. Ashley admits to Arshad that Daisy would not settle during her stay with them, but Arshad reminds him of Daisy's past, as she finds it difficult to trust adults. Mariam decides to contact social services. Dan and Ashley visit the Ahmeds again with social worker Viktoria (Cathy Walker). Ashley says he is worried that because he works from home and Dan works in the City, he will be the one to look after Daisy when she is unwell or school is closed and he may end up resenting Dan. Dan says he has always wanted to start a family and promises to take time off work to help. Ashley says he wants to go ahead with the adoption and Viktoria says they can proceed. Dan and Ashley later collect Daisy from Arshad and Mariam and thank them for looking after her.

Laura-Jayne Tyler of Inside Soap liked the characters and wished they could become regular characters, saying, "If only they were living on the Square, so that we could go on their adoption journey with them."

Hunter Owen

Hunter Owen, played by Charlie Winter, first appears in the episode broadcast on 6 February 2018. He is introduced as the teenage son of Mel Owen (Tamzin Outhwaite) and her dead husband Steve (Martin Kemp). Winter's initial final scenes as Owen aired on 12 April 2019. On 5 June 2019, it was announced that Hunter would return in the summer for a short stint. He returned on 23 August. Hunter died on 6 September after being shot by a police marksman in the middle of Albert Square. Hunter made his final appearance on 12 September 2019 after Mel identifies his body.

After Steve's death in a car explosion, Mel is arrested when she is implicated in Steve's drug smuggling; however, Steve's nemesis Phil Mitchell (Steve McFadden) agrees to bail her when he finds out she is pregnant. Mel later moves to Portugal before giving birth to Hunter. 15 years later, in January 2018, Mel returns to Walford to track down money stolen from her sister-in-law Ciara Maguire (Denise McCormack) and Ciara is keeping Hunter away from Mel until the money is recovered. When Ciara finds out Phil's wife Sharon Mitchell (Letitia Dean) took the money, Mel hands over the money to Ciara and Mel is reunited with Hunter, but when the money is not all recovered, Hunter is told the truth about Steve and his death: he died in a car explosion, not a heart attack, and killed Saskia Duncan (Deborah Sheridan-Taylor). Mel explains the circumstances of Saskia's death, how Steve incriminated his former employee Matthew Rose (Joe Absolom) for the crime and his death was a result of a car chase involving Phil's daughter Louise Mitchell (Tilly Keeper, but Rachel Cox at the time) - though she covers up Phil's involvement. Mel later compares Hunter to Steve and asks for them to start again. Hunter is pleased when Mel decides to remain in Walford and reopen the club that once belonged to Steve and Mel keeps the club as E20 for Hunter in tribute to Steve. Hunter claims he has no romantic interest in Louise when Tiffany Butcher (Maisie Smith) attempts to matchmake them, but Hunter later kisses Louise. Hunter stops Mel from going to Paris with Jack by removing a piece from his car engine, which Phil subtly advised him to do. Jack accidentally punches Hunter when he argues with Phil. At a Mitchell family dinner, a drunken Sharon reveals Phil as Steve's killer, but is seemingly left satisfied by Phil's explanation that the car explosion was not his fault. Louise decides she is ready to have sex with Hunter, but he keeps ignoring her until she confronts him, where she talks about her scars and sex and Hunter reassures Louise he will wait. Hunter persuades Phil to link up the club's CCTV to his phone on the opening night and prior to the opening, he and Louise have sex, with Hunter winking at the CCTV beforehand. Phil is enraged when he watches the CCTV and threatens to attack Hunter with a baseball bat as Hunter and Louise insist that the sex was consensual. Mel seduces and stands up to Phil to stop him from pursuing revenge against Hunter.

After Shakil Kazemi (Shaheen Jafargholi) dies from being stabbed, the teenagers spend time at E20 and they later find out money was stolen from the club. Louise breaks up with Hunter after finding out he sent a text reading 'I know what you did' to Louise and the other teenagers. Hunter injures himself, claiming Jack was responsible, but Mel changes her mind on believing him when Jack and Louise convince her Hunter is lying; Louise and Keegan also tell Mel and Jack respectively that Hunter took the money. After Jack feels Mel is too lenient towards Hunter, Hunter is forced to get a job and Ian takes him on to reconcile with Mel; Hunter uses Ian's plan to get away with trouble, however after urging by his friends Ian eventually sacks Hunter for not doing any work.

When Hunter sees Mel being attacked by her new husband Ray Kelly (Sean Mahon), he kills him by shooting Ray dead. When Mel's would-be-then boyfriend Jack Branning (Scott Maslen) finds out, he tells the police. Hunter confesses to the crime, and is sent to prison. Months later, he escapes. This prompts Mel to keep him from being discovered by letting him stay in an abandoned flat she owns. The pair later plan to escape, but Mel is distracted when Lisa unexpectedly appears and the two discuss their shared plan of fleeing Walford with Hunter and Louise. However, their conversation causes Hunter to seek out Jack on his own - taking Mel's gun with him in the process. When he infiltrates The Queen Victoria public house, Hunter finds Jack and holds him - along with several others - at gunpoint. He begins to force Jack to leave with him discreetly, but Hunter is quickly recognised - prompting him to instigate a siege by holding the punters hostage at gunpoint. When Jack attempts to get the gun off Hunter, Hunter ends up shooting Phil's son Ben Mitchell (Max Bowden). By then, Lisa and Mel learn of Hunter's situation and end up becoming his hostages as well - with Mel unsuccessfully pleading with Hunter to stop the siege. Hunter eventually takes a pregnant Louise outside and demands that he is given a car, otherwise he will kill her. When Louise's boyfriend Keanu Taylor (Danny Walters) tries to rescue Louise, Hunter shoots him in response. He then aims the gun at Louise, but she is saved when the police shoot Hunter - killing him. A distraught Mel rushes to her son and cradles him in her arms, mourning the loss of her only child.

On 23 October 2017, it was announced that Outhwaite would be returning to the serial after a sixteen-year absence. On 21 December 2017, the character and casting were announced. Hunter is fifteen years old and billed as "charming and charismatic" and similar to Steve, whose "sinister tendencies" he shares. However, Hunter also has good characteristics. Outhwaite described Hunter as "gorgeous and brilliant" and stated that his relationship with Mel is "fraught". She also said that all characters, male and female, would be attracted to Hunter. Hunter arrives in Walford, the show's setting, following Mel's return. Winter expressed his delight at joining the show, describing the experience as "really surreal". The actor commented, "It's an exciting time for me and I [cannot] wait to get stuck in and for everyone to meet Hunter."

Before the character's arrival, the Metro reported that Hunter could provide some happiness for Louise, with the pair knowing each other through Mel's friendship with Louise's mother, Lisa Fowler (Lucy Benjamin). Hunter and Louise are already "firm friends", but their relationship could develop as Hunter may "be the one to change Louise's view of romance and make her smile again." Laura-Jayne Tyler of Inside Soap thought that Winter looks like Kemp and praised the casting department for their work on casting Winter. In 2021, Hollyoaks actor Billy Price revealed that he auditioned for the role of Hunter, and made it "quite far down" into the audition process.

In July 2018, Winter was longlisted in the "Best Bad Boy" category at Inside Soap Awards.

Hayley Slater

Hayley Slater, played by Katie Jarvis, first appears in the episode broadcast on 9 February 2018. She is a relative of well-established characters Stacey (Lacey Turner) and Kat Slater (Jessie Wallace). The character last appears on 8 February 2019; on 28 March 2019 it was confirmed that Hayley would not be returning to the show.

Hayley is first seen taking photos of Stacey and her husband, Martin Fowler (James Bye). In the café, she looks through the photos and answers a phone call, asking if they received photos. She insults Martin to the caller, reassuring them that she knows what to do next. Hayley introduces herself to Martin at his stall and helps herself to an apple. Later in the café, Hayley distracts Martin when he is looking after his daughter, Hope Fowler, and Stacey catches Hayley kissing Martin. In Martin's absence, Hayley whispers to Stacey who she is when she asks. Stacey does not want Hayley around her, but she later gets in touch with Hayley and asks what she wants. Martin meets up with Hayley when he is looking after Hope and his stepson, Arthur Fowler (Hunter Bell) and Hayley encourages Martin to keep the children out for longer, disobeying Stacey's instructions. Hayley pretends to defend Martin in front of Stacey when she collects Arthur and Hope with police presence due to Martin not returning them. Later, Hayley visits Stacey and warns her not to soften towards Martin when she feels guilty as they are cousins and Slaters. Hayley later arrives in Walford again shortly after her family’s return to ask Kat’s grandmother Mo Harris (Laila Morse) for her share of money from the sale of SIM cards. When Hayley demands her money, Kat forcibly orders her to leave Walford. After spending the night sleeping rough, Stacey's mother, Jean Slater (Gillian Wright), invites Hayley around to the Slaters and Hayley opens up to Jean about her upbringing and being excluded from the family. Hayley is barred from The Queen Victoria from the landlady Linda Carter (Kellie Bright) when she sleeps in bed with her husband Mick Carter (Danny Dyer) after being paid by Stuart Highway (Ricky Champ). Martin discovers Hayley and Stacey are related and that Hayley does not have a son, but she later conceals her pregnancy. Hayley befriends a homeless girl, Brianna (Rina Diamond), who steals money from Hayley that she conned out of a man, Craig (Nigel Betts), by not going through with selling herself for sex. Craig motivates Hayley to contact her baby's father and she meets up with Kat's estranged husband, Alfie Moon (Shane Richie), informing him that he is the father of her child, but he does not want Hayley's child. After missing her earlier appointment for an abortion, Hayley cancels it and decides to keep her baby.

When the family receive the late Charlie Slater's (Derek Martin) taxi cab, they decide to sell it, but Hayley fixes it to use it for fares. Hayley is caught using it illegally by a police officer, who urges her to get a valid license, but Hayley gives up on becoming a taxi driver due to the length of the process. Hayley confides in Jean about being pregnant after the lack of trust towards her to look after Hope and Jean insists that the father shares responsibility. Jean sets up a meeting between Hayley and Dave (Will Rastall), a married man Hayley had an affair with and who Jean assumes is the father. Stacey finds out Hayley is pregnant when she interrupts Jean adjusting Hayley's clothes and Stacey demands to know if Martin is the father; after denying Martin is the father and snapping, Hayley decides to leave. Jean announces Hayley's pregnancy to the family in order to prevent Hayley from leaving and despite initial anger towards Jean, Hayley changes her mind when the family throw a baby shower for her. Hayley is unhappy when Jean orchestrates a reunion with her mother, Bev Slater (Ashley McGuire). Bev lies to Hayley about a changed positive lifestyle, but Hayley is angered by Bev's suggestion of blackmailing Alfie and further angered when Bev goes through her belongings. Hayley and Bev argue and berate each other, with Bev leaving Hayley when she bleeds. Upon Jean working out Alfie is the baby's father, Hayley goes onto the balcony of her family's old flat whilst drinking, but is talked down by Jean. Kat calls social services, who offer Hayley support.

On Halloween, Hayley goes into labour and decides to drive herself out of Walford but the taxi cab breaks down and Hayley is forced to give birth in a crack den and passes out shortly after; Kat and Keanu find Hayley and her daughter. Despite Kat and Jean's support, Hayley struggles to adapt to family life and runs away from home several times. Bev tries to sell Hayley's baby, but Kat intervenes, strengthening their bond. Just as Hayley is adjusting to life as a mother, Alfie returns and reconciles with Kat. He is stunned to realise that Hayley did not abort his child, and insists they keep the truth hidden from Kat. Hayley develops feelings for him when she sees him bond with their daughter, named Cherry by Alfie after his deceased mother. On Christmas Eve, Stacey witnesses Hayley kiss Alfie. She is horrified to uncover Cherry's paternity and issues an ultimatum: one of them goes, or Kat learns the truth. Hayley decides to go, but her parting gift to Alfie - a lock of Cherry's hair – is discovered by Kat and she works out the truth. After a furious showdown, Alfie turns nasty with Kat, who accuses him of taking advantage of Hayley's vulnerability. Hayley defends Kat and pushes Alfie down the stairs, seemingly killing him. However, as they discuss what to do, they discover Alfie survived the fall and has left with Cherry.  Kat convinces Alfie to return with Cherry which he does.  After realising that Hayley is not coping, Kat suggests that she and Alfie look after Cherry.  After she attempts suicide by stepping out in front of a minibus driven by Keanu, she tries to stab herself with a screwdriver and is then admitted to a psychiatric hospital. She later flees from the hospital, leaving only a note saying sorry to Kat. In 2020, it is revealed that during the COVID-19 pandemic lockdown, Kat returned Cherry to Hayley.

Development
On 22 December 2017, executive consultant John Yorke announced a new member of the Slater family would be introduced into EastEnders among the returning Slaters, to "sort Stacey out" after her big 2018 storyline. Hayley's connection to the Slater family was not immediately revealed upon the character's debut, but it was announced that she would be involved in "a brand new mystery" for Martin. Duncan Lindsey, writing for the Metro, suggested that Hayley could be connected to the Slater family, either helping Stacey fight against her estranged husband Martin or a new family member. The reporter also suggested that Hayley could be acquainted with Martin's former stalker, Sarah Cairns (Alison Pargeter). It was reported that Hayley would not be friends with Martin, who will have to "watch his back" throughout his custody battle with Stacey. The character was revealed as Stacey's cousin in her third episode. Of her casting, Jarvis said that she is "really excited to join a team of such lovely, talented people and become part of such an iconic show" and loves being a part of the Slater family, commenting that it is "going to be so much fun and I cannot wait to see what's in store for Hayley."

It was reported Hayley would have a "horror [...] ordeal" around Halloween as she will be alone as she gives birth, which is described as a "terrifying twist" and leaves Hayley "panic stricken." Hayley's anxiety also increases under the pressure of keeping the secret about the baby's paternity and her plan to "attempt to do a runner" is stopped when she goes into labour, putting her and her baby in a "worrying situation". Following the birth, Hayley, described as "struggling" and "overwhelmed", abandons her baby with foster carers Mariam and Arshad, however, her baby suffering a "scare" reportedly makes Hayley "rise to her responsibilities" and "reevaluate her earlier decision to give up her child."

In July 2018, Jarvis was longlisted for the "Best Newcomer", "Best Bad Girl" and "Best Shock Twist" awards at the Inside Soap Awards. For her portrayal of Hayley, Jarvis was nominated for Best Soap Newcomer at the 2018 Digital Spy Reader Awards; she came in third place with 13.2% of the total votes. Alfie being revealed as the father of Hayley's baby was nominated for Biggest OMG Soap moment; it came in fifth place with 8.3% of the total votes.

On 28 March 2019, it was confirmed that Jarvis had left the show and that there were no immediate plans for her to return, though her last episode was on 8 February 2019.

Magic Marv

Magic Marv, played by Steve Steen, appears in the episode broadcast on 20 February 2018.

Magic Marv is a children's television performer. Tina Carter (Luisa Bradshaw-White) meets him when she is hungover and he reveals the details of the night before when they got drunk and got tattoos of Peter Pan. Tina is shocked by her own behaviour especially as she used to watch Magic Marv on TV when her daughter, Zsa Zsa Carter (Emer Kenny) was a child. Marv then puts on a show at the community centre but he appears drunk and everyone is shocked at how poor his performance is. He calls Stacey Fowler (Lacey Turner) a "yummy mummy" and refers to her as "Sally", insults Martin Fowler (James Bye), and makes comments about Kush Kazemi (Davood Ghadami) being the father of Arthur Fowler (Hunter Bell), who Stacey and Martin have brought to the show. During the interval, Martin finds Marv in the pub and tells him off for drinking and gets angry when he calls Stacey "Sally" again. When the show continues, he gets Kush and Martin on the stage to sing but sends Martin off when he does badly. Marv makes another comment about Stacey and Kush, so Martin knocks Marv's hat off and stamps on one of his drums.

David Brown of the Radio Times described Magic Marv as "a drunk, shambling mess who insults the dads and ineptly flirts with the mums!" Laura-Jayne Tyler of Inside Soap disliked the character and felt that Martin and Stacey's reactions to him resembled that of the audience.

Georgi

Georgi, played by Holly Donovan, first appears in the episode broadcast on 20 February 2018. She is a friend of Zsa Zsa Carter (Emer Kenny), who is Tina Carter's (Luisa Bradshaw-White) daughter.

When pregnant Georgi is in the café, she becomes breathless and Tina helps her. Georgi later meets Tina's sister Shirley Carter (Linda Henry) in The Queen Victoria pub, and Shirley gives her £100 cash and offers to meet her later. When Georgi nearly falls into a table, Tina tries to help her again but Georgi realises she is Zsa Zsa's mother and tells her not to give her any advice as she was a bad mother to Zsa Zsa. Georgi tells Tina that she does not have a good relationship with her mother and Tina tries to encourage Georgi to reach out to her mother. Georgi is furious that Tina met up with her mother, Tilly (Jacqueline Roberts), and disclosed where she is, which also infuriates Shirley. Georgi goes into labour and despite Georgi rejecting her, Tina helps Georgi give birth to her son and reassures her that she will be a good mother.

The character of Georgi was announced in February 2018. It was reported that Georgi is already familiar with Tina's sister Shirley and Tina is "alarmed" that Georgi and Zsa Zsa are friends while Georgi is unhappy that Tina is Zsa Zsa's mother. It was also said that Georgi's arrival changes Tina's choice to "reevaluate the state of her life", but the "unpleasant surprise" of Zsa Zsa asking Shirley to help Georgi on her behalf forces Tina to "think about the current state of her relationship" with Zsa Zsa. Tina unintentionally makes thing "a whole lot more complicated" for Georgi when Tina attempts to fix Georgi's relationship with her mother, but gives away Georgi's location.

Laura-Jayne Tyler of Inside Soap called Georgi a "pregnant Walford waif" and believed that producers originally planned for Zsa Zsa to appear, but when Kenny declined a return, they introduced Georgi. Tyler questioned why they did not recast Zsa Zsa and felt that Georgi's appearance was "so random".

Mitch Baker

Mitch Baker, played by Roger Griffiths, first appears in episode 5670, first broadcast on 12 March 2018. Mitch is the father of established character Keegan Baker (Zack Morris) and the former boyfriend of Karen Taylor (Lorraine Stanley). After appearing in six episodes across two stints, Mitch departs in episode 5679, first broadcast on 27 March. Eight months later, it was announced that Mitch would return again. Mitch was reintroduced as a regular character in 2019 by incoming senior executive producer Kate Oates, and executive producer Jon Sen. He returned with his daughter Chantelle Atkins (Jessica Plummer).

Mitch arrives on Albert Square and reunites with Keanu Taylor (Danny Walters), the half-brother of his daughter Chantelle and son Keegan. Keanu undertakes work on Mitch's van and warns him to keep away from his family, lying that they do not live on Albert Square. Mitch leaves without paying so later returns, having followed Keanu to his house. Mitch shouts for Karen and Keegan at the flat, but Keanu punches him. Keegan is shocked to see him. The next day, Mitch flirts with Karen at the launderette where she works and they talk about how Mitch helped raise Keanu but then left when Keegan was born, then later took on her other children but left again five years previously. He insists he has changed and wants to settle down. When Karen brings Mitch home, Keegan, Keanu and their half-sister, Bernadette Taylor (Clair Norris), are against him being there and he leaves when Keegan insists, but Karen later sneaks him into the flat.

Keanu is angry when he finds out Mitch stayed the night, while Bernadette and Keegan are happy to have him there, and Keanu decides to move out and stay with a friend. Mitch urges Karen to tell Keanu the truth about his own father, but when Karen tries, Keanu walks away. Keegan then overhears Karen and Mitch agreeing not to tell Keanu that his father received a 12-year prison sentence for attempting to kill Karen. The next day, Keegan mentions that he heard them talking, so Mitch explains what happened. Mitch asks Keegan to convince Keanu to move back home, which he does. While sitting with the family, Mitch receives a text message asking where he is. Mitch agrees to walk the family dog, Bronson, and finds him chewing an envelope of money, which Patrick Trueman (Rudolph Walker) has posted for the Taylors' upstairs neighbours, Ted Murray (Christopher Timothy) and Joyce Murray (Maggie Steed). Mitch says this was his fate and leaves with the money.

When Keegan is suspended from school for three days, Mitch invites Keegan's headteacher, Mrs Robyn Lund (Polly Highton), to the flat, who gets Keegan to apologise and she reduces his suspension to one day. Karen is annoyed when she hears about Keegan's suspension and Mitch's interference, but Keegan wants them to get along. When Mitch goes to see Karen, he breaks up with his wife over the phone and removes his wedding ring. His wife Marla (Elicia Daly), arrives on Albert Square to see Karen as she wants Mitch back, announcing she is pregnant and both Karen and Marla confront Mitch. When Mitch returns to Marla, she reveals she is not pregnant.

The character and Griffiths' casting details were announced on 26 February 2018. Griffiths previously appeared in the role of D.I. Christopher Riddick from 2004 to 2005. He said "coming in as Mitch – the wild card – meant I had to hit the ground running." Mitch shows up at The Arches when his van breaks down, but his "shifty behaviour" makes it clear that his arrival is not a coincidence. The character left Walford during the episode broadcast on 16 March, but it was confirmed by Sophie Dainty of Digital Spy that he had not made his final appearance. Mitch returned in the episode broadcast on 26 March, and departed again in the following episode, broadcast on 27 March. Laura-Jayne Tyler of Inside Soap liked Mitch, writing, "We think EastEnders is on to a winner with Keegan's charming-but-edgy dad, Mitch. He's very watchable." On 12 November 2018, it was announced that Griffiths had reprised the role and Mitch would return in late 2018. Bea Mitchell of Digital Spy billed the return as "dramatic" and reported that Mitch would cause more trouble for the Taylor family. On his return, Griffiths commented, "It feels great to be returning to Albert Square and working with the wonderful cast and crew again, especially the fantastic Taylor family. I'm excited for the viewers to learn more about Mitch and see what trouble he gets himself into this time."

Harley

Harley first appears in the episode broadcast on 19 March 2018. He is a foster child of Arshad Ahmed (Madhav Sharma) and Mariam Ahmed (Indira Joshi).

Mariam arrives home with Harley and a social worker, telling Arshad that they have been asked to foster him. Arshad and his nephew, Masood Ahmed (Nitin Ganatra) struggle to settle Harley due to the possibility he is addicted to heroin through his birth mother, but Karen Tayor (Lorraine Stanley) helps them to realise that grime music helps settle him. Harley's father Bijan (Jonas Khan) tracks Harley down from a selfie taken by Tiffany Butcher (Maisie Smith) of her with Harley and informs Harley's mother, Chloe (Lauren Fitzpatrick). Chloe is reunited with Harley when she pretends to Arshad she has been the victim of a mugging. Bijan kidnaps Harley shortly afterwards, but they are eventually arrested and Harley is returned to the Ahmeds. In October 2018, Chloe arrives at the Ahmeds to collect Harley and Chloe is given a book by the Ahmeds of Harley during his stay with them.

On 13 March 2018, it was reported that Harley would present a "big new challenge" for the Ahmeds upon his arrival, especially as Harley will be in their care for the "foreseeable future." Harley is described as a "handful" who "won't settle", something that is feared by the family and Arshad finds himself "struggling to care" for Harley, causing him to become frustrated. It was reported that Karen would be a "surprising" help for the Ahmeds with Harley. It was later reported that the arrival of Harley's birth mother, Chloe, presents the Ahmed family with a "nightmare" when she kidnaps Harley.

Judith Thompson

Judith Thompson, played by Emma Fielding, appears in the series between 3 and 6 April 2018. She is the daughter of Ted Murray (Christopher Timothy) and Joyce Murray (Maggie Steed).

Judith arrives in Walford when Ted contacts following Joyce's death. She sorts through Joyce's belongings and is upset when she finds out that Ted did not inform her and Alan of Joyce's death for three days. She reluctantly gives Ted an update on how her children are and later meets Ted and Joyce's neighbours, including Bernadette Taylor (Clair Norris), who Ted has been teaching chess to. Ted decides he wants to show Judith off to the neighbours so takes her to the café, where he sits with Bernadette to play chess. Judith loses her temper, berating him as a father and a husband. Judith later calls someone, saying she wants Ted to be put in a care home. Judith later mentions this to Bernadette, who informs Ted. Ted confronts her, saying that she is doing it as she is unhappy with her husband, Freddie, something he warned her about prior to their marriage. Judith leaves after Bernadette and Karen insist they will look after Ted.

Upon her arrival, David Brown from the Radio Times said that "long-standing family tensions" in the Murray family "rise to the surface" as it becomes apparent that Judith does not "hold [Ted] in high regard." Judith is jealous of the "parental affection" she witnesses Ted giving Bernadette Taylor (Clair Norris) through "obvious pride and affection" from their shared interest in chess.

Bijan and Chloe

Bijan, played by Jonas Khan, and Chloe, played by Lauren Fitzpatrick, are the parents of Harley, who is being fostered by Arshad Ahmed (Madhav Sharma) and Mariam Ahmed (Indira Joshi). Bijan appears between episode 5693, first broadcast on 20 April 2018, and episode 5696, first broadcast on 26 April. Chloe appears between episode 5694, first broadcast on 23 April 2018, and episode 5696, although she makes an appearance in episode 5799, originally broadcast on 23 October 2018.

Bijan arrives in Walford to track down Harley after Tiffany Butcher (Maisie Smith) posts a selfie online of her and Harley on social media. He tries to find Tiffany by telling Donna Yates (Lisa Hammond) that she is his girlfriend, and Donna reveals she is still a child. Bijan sees Harley with Mariam and phones Chloe, informing her that Harley is fine. Chloe arrives and tells Arshad that she has been mugged. Arshad invites her to his home and she is reunited with Harley. She sees they have CCTV set up, and in the night, Bijan vandalises it. Social services visit because of this and Arshad discovers Chloe's true identity from a photo. The social worker reveals that Bijan has been in prison for domestic violence, drug dealing and kidnapping. Arshad and his nephew, Masood Ahmed (Nitin Ganatra), secure the house but Bijan is already hiding inside. He kidnaps Harley during the night and the police are called. Bijan and Chloe struggle to escape from Walford when the car breaks down so they hide at the car lot where Bijan has assaulted Max Branning (Jake Wood). Chloe suffers from withdrawal symptoms, but Bijan says her drugs are in the car; Max gives him the keys to another car and he hides there until the police are gone. Meanwhile, Max's wife, Rainie Branning (Tanya Franks), a former drug addict, asks Chloe if she can keep Harley safe. When Bijan drives the car up to the office, Chloe enters the car without Harley and Bijan says they have wasted their time. Max shouts to the police and Bijan drives away at speed. Bijan and Chloe are later arrested and Harley is returned to the Ahmeds. Six months later, Chloe has turned her life around and Harley is allowed to be returned to him. She arrives at the Ahmeds to collect Harley and gives struggling expectant mother Hayley Slater (Katie Jarvis) advice. Chloe is given a book by the Ahmeds of Harley during his stay with them and she asks if Harley can visit in the future.

Bijan was described by Duncan Lindsay from the Metro as "mysterious", and Sophie Dainty from Digital Spy reported that Bijan's arrival would "kick off an intriguing new storyline." Chloe's introduction was reported by Lindsay, who said she is "clearly on a mission". It was reported that Chloe would present the Ahmed family with a "nightmare" when she kidnaps Harley, commencing a "frantic" search.

Henry

Henry, played by Andrew Alexander, first appears on 30 April 2018. He brings his car to the local garage and asks Keanu Taylor (Danny Walters) to repair it and gives him money, asking Keanu to call him a cab. He is rude towards Keanu and when he returns later, Keanu explains that the parts need to be ordered. Sharon Mitchell (Letitia Dean) tells Henry to go elsewhere, so he asks for his money back, but Sharon says he should behave in a more civilised manner. Henry then drives his car away after telling Sharon to keep the cash and he will look her up when he comes back. Sharon and Keanu realise they still have his spare keys and know where he lives, so they steal his car and plan to put it into storage and wrack up speeding fines. The next day, Henry returns and meets Phil Mitchell (Steve McFadden), accusing him, Keanu or Sharon of stealing his car. Phil tells him he must have lost his keys. Phil then finds out what happened from Sharon, and Keanu brings back Henry's car, then they leave it at Max Branning's (Jake Wood) car lot so they can falsely accuse Max of the theft. However, Max and his wife, Rainie Branning (Tanya Franks) realise they are being set up and have the car removed and sold.

An EastEnders source told Inside Soap Tom Spilsbury that Henry "dislikes dealing with Keanu" and "rudely patronises Sharon after she offers her assistance", saying that she does not like his "casual sexism" and decides to "teach him a lesson".

Stuart Highway

Stuart Highway, played by Ricky Champ, first appears on 8 May 2018, though he is not credited until his second appearance on 10 May. He is the older brother of Callum "Halfway" Highway (Tony Clay) and a childhood friend of Mick Carter (Danny Dyer). Champ's casting was revealed in March 2018 by his agency, while the character and further details were officially announced by the BBC on 28 March 2018, on which Champ said, "I'm so happy to be part of this brilliant team of people on this great show that I grew up watching. Look out Albert Square... Stuart's coming!" It was announced on 10 June 2022 that Champ had been axed by new producer Chris Clenshaw with Stuart set to exit the show later in the year. His final scenes aired on 25 August 2022.

Stuart arrives in a blacked-out car, watching Mick Carter (Danny Dyer), though the car's arrival worries several other people. While Mick is alone in The Queen Victoria pub, a masked man grabs him. However, this is proven to be a prank by Stuart, who says he has been watching Mick all day. They head to the bar of the pub, where Mick's wife, Linda Carter (Kellie Bright), is not happy to see Stuart. Stuart's brother, Halfway, talks about how he was injured in Iraq by shrapnel, but Stuart later tells Halfway he knows he is lying and to tell him what really happened. Stuart tells Halfway that Mick may not forgive him for lying, but Halfway admits that he blames himself for a woman's death when he was saving her child and Mick says it was not his fault, so Halfway tells Stuart he was wrong. Stuart then pays Hayley Slater (Katie Jarvis) to get in bed with a drunken Mick while Linda is away. Linda returns in the morning and she and Mick realise Stuart is to blame, so Linda tells Mick to make sure Stuart never returns, but Mick says Stuart went to a Young Offender Institute instead of Mick when they were 13 and Linda has to accept their friendship. Linda is upset when Stuart breaks her favourite mug, but is thankful when he fixes it, though Stuart insults Linda to Halfway.

Mick hides Stuart's phone as a prank but Stuart overreacts when he cannot find it and Mick sees pictures of and messages to schoolgirls on the phone. Mick confronts Stuart and reports him to the police. However, Stuart explains to Mick that he poses as underage girls online to expose paedophiles. Mick then observes Stuart confronting a man and soon realises that Stuart wants Mick's help to confront more paedophiles. Stuart reveals that he has helped put 17 men in prison and that when he was in the Young Offender Institute, he suffered abuse from an officer. Mick agrees to help Stuart confront a man, but the man is Stuart's friend and they are just testing Mick. Mick is humiliated and Stuart says Mick cannot handle it and adds that he saved Mick from abuse by taking the blame for what Mick did when they were teenagers and calls Mick a coward, which leads to them fighting. Linda then asks Mick to not see Stuart again. Stuart meets Mick anyway and asks Halfway to help confront someone. Mick tries to stop it, and the man, Fred Lewis, runs away. Stuart later asks Halfway to confront Fred again, but Stuart takes over at the last minute, and Mick tells Stuart he has made a mistake with Fred, however, Stuart still posts his confrontation video online. Fred is attacked and Mick gives Stuart an alibi, but the police tell Mick that Fred was contacting local girls to search for his daughter, and this leads to another fight between Mick and Stuart. Mick tells Stuart to post a retraction video, which he does but also vows revenge on Mick. Stuart then intimidates Linda when they are alone, and when Mick finds out, forces him to apologise. Mick's aunt, Tina Carter (Luisa Bradshaw-White), sees Stuart and is wary of him. Tina and Stuart then go out to a 1980s music night, where Stuart requests a song, "We Call It Acieed", that gives Tina a terrifying flashback. Tina tells Sonia Fowler (Natalie Cassidy) that when she was 19 or 20, she would play a game with Stuart and his friends that involved mild "torture", but once she was locked in a car boot, tied up and gagged, and feared she would die when she smelt burning. She recalls that "We Call It Acieed" was playing in the car and Stuart must have done it to her. Tina confronts Stuart but he says it must have been someone else. Tina decides to tell Mick and Linda but Stuart has already told them, and when Stuart knows that Tina was called a "slag" that night, she again thinks it was him. She tells Mick and Linda this, and recalls the football shirt the attacker was wearing, which Mick says Stuart was wearing that day. Mick confronts Stuart and vows to never see Stuart again, and Stuart stabs an old photograph of Mick. Stuart then keys his own car and tells people that Tina did it. He accuses her of starting a hate campaign against him but makes various threats and teases her, singing "We Call It Acieed" and goading her with a wrench, which she takes and hits him on the head with.

After the attack, Stuart seeks revenge on the Carters and unbeknownst to Linda, sneaks into the pub at night, touches Linda in her sleep and records it on video, sending it to Mick. Mick later goes round to Stuart's house and Stuart asks Mick to kill him, goading Mick to attack him when Stuart taunts him about Linda. Later that night, Stuart sneaks into the pub and is shot by an unknown assailant and goes into a coma. His daughter Zara Highway (Faye Daveney) arrives in Walford and claims that one of the Carters shot Stuart. Linda, thinking that Mick has shot him, as he lied about walking Lady Di, then takes the gun and dumps it in the canal to protect him, however she is spotted by Keanu Taylor (Danny Walters). Later, when Mick asks Linda her whereabouts, she tells him she knows but he is adamant he did not do it and Linda worries whether she did the right thing, though Mick reassures her. The next day, Linda is arrested for Stuart's attempted murder as the rest of the square watch on. When Stuart regains consciousness, he states that Mick shot him. Mick is later arrested and imprisoned. When Stuart makes his statement to the police, Stuart picks at his wound with a fork to cause bleeding, which Zara sees, but Stuart insists that Mick shot him; Zara provides Stuart with an alibi on the day Mick went to Stuart's and Stuart wanted Mick to kill him. Upon being discharged, Zara accompanies Stuart to The Vic, where he offers to tell the police that Mick shot him accidentally in exchange for them to accept Mick is guilty and Zara believes Stuart. Zara is lured to The Vic by Halfway in order for Linda to persuade her that Mick is not responsible and she visits Mick, showing her cigarette burns inflicted on her by herself due to having a childhood without Stuart present and wants him to confess. Zara begins to doubt Stuart when Mick tells her that Linda knew Zara's mum by both her and Mick, and eventually walks out on Stuart. Furious, Stuart then hires fellow convicts in prison to help make Mick's life miserable there.

Later, Linda calls time on her marriage to Mick when he admits he started smothering Stuart. She betrays Mick by visiting Stuart, ignoring Mick's desperate phone call and telephoning Stuart saying she believes him. Linda and Stuart begin meeting regularly and become close despite the family's, especially Tina's, protests. She tells the family she thinks Mick is guilty, throws away her wedding rings, and later throws the family out, then allows Stuart to move in, and calls a solicitor to begin divorce proceedings from Mick. What Stuart, Mick and the rest of their family does not know is that all this is a mere smokescreen from Linda to conceal her plan to help get Mick out of prison, which she eventually confesses to her mother-in-law Shirley Carter (Linda Henry) and swears her to secrecy.  Linda manages to get Stuart to confess that Mick did not shoot him and he is arrested for perverting the course of justice.  Mick bundles Stuart into the boot of a car and drives to an abandoned factory where he vows to kill him.

Laura-Jayne Tyler of Inside Soap described Stuart as "lairy" and called him "the most objectionable new character in years!" In July 2018, Champ was longlisted for "Best Bad Boy" at The Inside Soap Awards. Stuart's shooting was nominated for Best Soap Storyline at the 2018 Digital Spy Reader Awards; it came in ninth place with 4.3% of the total votes. The reveal that Stuart shot himself was nominated for Biggest OMG Soap moment; it came in tenth place with 4.3% of the total votes. The following year, Champ received a National Television Awards nomination in the Newcomer category for his portrayal of Stuart. In July 2019, Champ was longlisted for "Best Bad Boy" again at The Inside Soap Awards 2019.

Brianna

Brianna, played by Rina Diamond, appears in one episode on 22 May 2018. She is a homeless girl who Hayley Slater (Katie Jarvis) talks to on the London Underground and Hayley tells her how she can stay on the train after it reaches the end of the line. Brianna tells Hayley she is 16 despite Hayley thinking she looks 12. Brianna asks Hayley if she has spare sanitary products, so Hayley tells her she can use a sock, but Brianna is not wearing socks. Hayley gives Brianna some cash that she had previously conned from Craig (Nigel Betts) and tells her to go to a shop at the next station, and gives her extra cash so she can get back on the tube. When Brianna returns, she has beer instead and tells Hayley that she stole some socks. Brianna tells Hayley that her mother is a drug addict and alcoholic and she is better off now. Brianna guesses that Hayley is pregnant when she refuses alcohol. Hayley falls asleep and when she wakes up, Brianna and the rest of her money are gone.

After the episode was broadcast, Diamond tweeted that Brianna was an "amazing character to play with so much depth". Viewers noticed a continuity error in Brianna's scenes, as she was able to get off the train, locate the beer, purchase it and return to exactly the same train.

Umar Kazemi

Umar Kazemi, played by Selva Rasalingam, first appears in the episode broadcast on 25 May 2018. Umar is the former husband of Carmel Kazemi (Bonnie Langford) and father of Kush Kazemi (Davood Ghadami), Darius Kazemi (Ash Rizi) and Shakil Kazemi (Shaheen Jafargholi). Rasalingam's casting in the role of Umar was reported on 22 May 2018. Umar departs in the episode first broadcast on 6 July 2018.

Umar arrives in Walford following Shakil being stabbed to death and asks how it happened. The following week, he tells Carmel that he has spoken to the imam about Shakil's funeral, and says that it was a "blessing" that Shakil was "taken" this month, saying it was a "gift from God". This angers Carmel, as Shakil was not religious and she says Umar was not there for him. She insults Umar, calling him a drinker and adulterer. Umar later talks to Carmel about when Shakil was born, and she says she no longer wants to be angry with Umar. He invites her and Kush to dinner with him and his partner, Ashleen, and says she can visit him in Dubai. Carmel realises that Umar wants Kush to move to Dubai, and this leads to Carmel attempting suicide.

Darius Kazemi

Darius Kazemi, played by Ash Rizi, first appears in the episode broadcast on 28 May 2018. Darius is the son of Carmel Kazemi (Bonnie Langford) and Umar Kazemi (Selva Rasalingam) and brother to Kush Kazemi (Davood Ghadami) and Shakil Kazemi (Shaheen Jafargholi). Rizi's casting in the role of Darius was first confirmed by Rizi's acting agency, who confirmed he would appear for three episodes. It was then reported on 22 May 2018 that Darius and Umar will arrive following Shakil's death in a stabbing, with Sophie Dainty of Digital Spy reporting that Darius is "desperate for someone to blame". Darius departs in the episode first broadcast on 6 July 2018.

Darius arrives and immediately asks to see Shakil's friend, Keegan Baker (Zack Morris), who was also attacked alongside Shakil but survived, and asks Keegan what Shakil's last words were, accusing him of not waiting for Shakil to get help because Keegan was taken to hospital first. Kush tells Darius he is being unfair. Darius later reminds Kush that he still wants him to go into business with him in Dubai, but Kush says he will not go now.

Amal Hussain

Amal Hussain, played by Natasha Jayetileke, appears in the episodes broadcast on 14 and 15 June 2018. She is contacted by Masood Ahmed (Nitin Ganatra) on a dating website and they go on a date together. Masood pretends to be a perfect Muslim to impress Amal, even when she says she is not a practising Muslim. Masood believes she is the daughter of a businessman, Habib Hussain, and hopes that the date can lead to him meeting Habib. However, when Shirley Carter (Linda Henry) discovers Masood's plan, she introduces herself to Amal and says she can give a reference to Amal's father. Amal tells Masood that her father, Asir, is dead. She realises that Masood was putting on an act to impress her, though Masood tries to say that he is still interested in her. She says if he was not a liar she might have fancied him, and leaves. The next day, Amal meets Masood and asks him to take her on a date as long as he is himself. They meet in the café, and Amal's mother, Rana Hussain (Taru Devani), who set up Amal's dating profile, arrives, so Amal asks Masood to lie that they have been dating for two months. Masood is confused when Rana says that he wants to marry Amal, and Amal says Masood should meet the rest of their family tonight so she can show her single cousins that dating sites work. However, Kathy Beale (Gillian Taylforth) realises that Amal is using Masood to show Rana that she does not want to date, so Kathy kisses Masood, causing Rana to leave. Amal thanks Masood and Kathy as it will keep her mother from interfering for a few months.

Amal's storyline was reported by Inside Soap before being broadcast, who said that even though she is not who Masood thought she was, she "seems genuinely keen on getting to know him". Inside Soap also called Amal "enigmatic".

Jessica Jones

Jessica Jones, played by Tara Lee, first appears in the episode broadcast on 31 July 2018. She is introduced as a love interest for Jay Brown (Jamie Borthwick). Jessica last appears in the episode broadcast on 16 August 2018.

Jessica is a woman who answers an advert from Jay Brown and Billy Mitchell (Perry Fenwick), who are looking for a new housemate. Jay is attracted to her and she is interested in his job as an undertaker. She says she works freelance but wants to be a tattoo artist, and she and Jay share interests in gaming and football. After she leaves, Jay agrees to let her move in. Jessica moves in and accepts that Jay is on the Sex Offender Register due to a relationship he had with someone who lied about her age. Billy sees Jessica with Rainie Branning (Tanya Franks) and discovers from Rainie that Jessica is a prostitute. Billy asks her to move out, and Jay wonders why, so Billy asks Jessica to lie to Jay and let him down gently as he likes her, but she asks to be paid to do so. Jessica tells Jay she is moving in with a former boyfriend. Rainie then sees Billy paying Jessica.

The character was announced on 24 July 2018. Jessica is introduced as a new love interest for Jay Brown who moves in with him and Billy Mitchell. Jessica was billed as "scheming", while Sorcha O'Connor of the Irish Independent called her a "strong, confident young woman" and a "tough cookie". Lee described the character as a "strong female role". Sophie Dainty of Digital Spy noted that Jay thinks "all his Christmases had come at once" when Jessica arrives. Jessica is a guest character and leaves during the final episode of the week, leaving Jay "disappointed". The character is not credited with a surname on screen. In promotional material, it was teased that Jessica would know another character, but that character's identity was embargoed. It was later revealed that Jessica is a sex worker and knows Rainie Branning. Lee liked how Jessica was proud of her occupation and how the character acknowledges the difference between a prostitute and a sex worker. She added, "I was really passionate about what [Jessica] stood for, as I think we both share the same disdain for unfair judgement, and that's probably where I see myself in her." Lee received a positive reaction to her Dublin accent and Jessica's bond with Jay. She told O'Connor that she would like to return to the role for a longer stint.

Marky

Marky (credited as Marky – Pizza Boy), played by Niall O'Mara, appears on 3 August 2018. He is a pizza delivery boy for Lorenzo's Pizza who brings 10 pizzas to The Queen Victoria pub for the Carters. Mick Carter (Danny Dyer) says they have not ordered pizzas, and threatens Marky with violence when he insists on being paid. Marky goes outside to get his tablet to show the family the order, but he discovers his moped has gone and claims he was set up by the Carters. The police are then called. It emerges that Stuart Highway (Ricky Champ) set up the entire scenario and stole the moped.

Digital Spy reported that viewers were "in love" with the character and wanted him to appear again, and called him "gobby" and "a very unlikely new favourite character". Inside Soap said he had a "tiny role" but made the "absolute best of it".

Jagger Rawley

Jagger Rawley, played by Aaron Thomas Ward, first appears on 6 August 2018. He is in a gang with Stix Redman (Kasey McKellar), Biggie and Bunhead. They are in a fast-food restaurant and are seen selling mobile phones by 12-year-old Dennis Rickman (Bleu Landau). Dennis buys a phone from them, and when Stix and Jagger see the police, they ask Dennis to hide the bag of phones somewhere safe and they will pay him for it. Dennis hides the bag at the mechanic's garage belonging to his stepfather, Phil Mitchell (Steve McFadden), and it is found by Keanu Taylor (Danny Walters). Keegan Baker (Zack Morris) later sees the gang trying to steal a bicycle and tells them it is not worth it, and they ask if he is the person who was stabbed recently. The gang then return to the garage to collect the bag, but Keanu threatens them with a crowbar. He says they can have the bag as long as they do not return and leave Dennis alone. Phil then arrives and sends them away and they say they will be back. Keanu then finds cannabis in the bag and Dennis receives a text saying "you're dead". The next day, Keanu sees the gang outside the garage but they leave when Phil calls them immature. They then find Dennis in the café and Jagger tells Dennis he now works for them, threatening to tell Phil what Dennis has hidden in the garage. Keanu arrives and sends them away. Keanu decides to throw the bag in the canal, telling Dennis the gang will not return, but he later finds the garage has been burgled and vandalised by the gang. Jagger appears with the bag and Keanu tells him it is now over so leave Dennis alone, but Jagger says he will decide when it is over. Keanu texts Jagger from Dennis's phone, asking to meet at the garage. There, Keanu asks for the tools back that they stole but Jagger says they have sold them. Keanu then says he recorded Jagger's burglary boast and tells them to leave. The gang see Dennis watching them and chase after him, and he ends up with a bloody nose, while the gang beat up Keanu, stamping on him. Phil arrives and fights the gang off. Jagger and his gang continue to hang around the garage and when Stix tells Dennis that Jagger has a job for him and Dennis refuses, the gang attempt to kidnap him in a stolen car, but Keanu and Sharon rescue him.

Jagger meets 15-year-old Tiffany Butcher (Maisie Smith) and later takes her to the park to meet the rest of his gang, and he gives her alcohol. Jagger meets her again and warns off two girls who make Tiffany feel uncomfortable, and he invites Tiffany to his house. Whitney Dean (Shona McGarty) catches Tiffany returning the next day. Tiffany admits to Whitney that Jagger is 19 years old but promises nothing sexual happened between them. Jagger later gives Tiffany a new phone with £50 of credit, saying she can contact him and nobody needs to know.

It was reported on 24 August 2018 that 19-year-old Jagger would be involved in a storyline with 15-year-old Tiffany Butcher (Maisie Smith) in which he potentially grooms her, and Duncan Lindsay from Metro said that "His gift giving and manipulative behaviour are warning signs that he is grooming Tiffany".

Adam Bateman

Adam Bateman, played by Stephen Rahman-Hughes, first appears on 23 August 2018. He is a former foster son of Arshad Ahmed (Madhav Sharma) and Mariam Ahmed (Indira Joshi) and a love interest for Honey Mitchell (Emma Barton). It was announced in September 2019 that Adam had been axed from the soap, and he made his last appearance on 3 December 2019.

When Honey has toothache and unable to get an appointment with a dentist, Arshad arranges for Honey to see his foster son Adam at a dental practice. After the appointment, Adam asks Honey out for dinner. They then go on a date and the next day, Adam sees Honey in Albert Square, and Honey admits to her former partner, Billy Mitchell (Perry Fenwick), that she went on a date with Adam. Adam begins an affair with Habiba Ahmed (Rukku Nahar) in 2019. When Honey sees Adam with Habiba on the CCTV at the Minute Mart, she questions him about it, but he convinces her that Habiba is like a sister to him. Habiba's sister, Iqra Ahmed (Priya Davdra) learns of the affair, and threatens him, saying that his affair will come out. As part of a "wife swap" event, Adam stays at Iqra's house, where she sees that he is also seeing a woman called Sally. Iqra tells Honey, who later exposes Adam in front of an audience, and throws him out of the flat, hitting him in the face with a bin.

Rahman-Hughes' casting and the character of Adam were announced on 7 August 2018. Of his casting, Rahman-Hughes said he is "thrilled to [be] joining" EastEnders, calling the cast "incredible" and the show "iconic", adding "it really is a dream come true". Billed as "dashing", it was reported that, as Adam "establishes" himself as the local dentist, he would "set his sights" on Honey and that a potential relationship between Adam and Honey will make Honey's former partner, Billy, "less than happy when he learns that Honey is moving on", so could "seek to make things difficult for the pair." It was also reported that Adam would be "making an impact" for Arshad and Mariam, who fostered Adam from the age of eight.

DCI Peter Arthurs

DCI Peter Arthurs made his first appearance on 4 September 2018. He is portrayed by Ian Burfield, who previously played DI Hamilton in 1997 and DI Kelly between 2007 and 2010. He first arrives as a detective inspector investigating the shooting of Stuart Highway (Ricky Champ); he has since continued to make recurring appearances.

DCI Arthurs first appears investigating the shooting of Stuart Highway (Ricky Champ) at The Queen Victoria pub, questioning landlord Mick Carter (Danny Dyer) and his wife, Linda Carter (Kellie Bright). Over two years later, Arthurs, now a detective chief inspector, questions Gray Atkins (Toby-Alexander Smith) about the death of his wife, Chantelle Atkins (Jessica Plummer). He then questions Gray about Kheerat Panesar (Jaz Deol) after a report is made against him; Gray informs Arthurs that Kheerat wanted Chantelle to leave Gray for him, but believes that he would not harm Chantelle. Arthurs visits Gray to inform him that the coroner has ruled Chantelle's death accidental; he explains that he thought it would be a comfort to hear the news, which Gray rejects. Following the attack on Ian Beale (Adam Woodyatt), he arrests Tina Carter (Luisa Bradshaw-White) on suspicion of assaulting Ian; she is later cleared by him. Whitney Dean (Shona McGarty) develops suspicions over Chantelle's death that occurred nearly two years earlier and she tells Arthurs she believes Gray murdered her. Arthurs speaks to Gray, leading to him dismissing Whitney's concerns. He later informs Shirley Carter (Linda Henry) and Mick Carter (Danny Dyer) that Tina's body has been recovered from the derelict building that was the Argee Bhajee Indian restaurant. Accusations are made again about Gray, this time suspecting him of murdering Tina as well as Chantelle. Evidence is found and Arthurs finally arrests Gray for the murders.

Ray Kelly

Raymond "Ray" Kelly, played by Sean Mahon, first appears on 4 September 2018. Ray is the former husband of Mel Owen (Tamzin Outhwaite) and the stepfather to Mel's son, Hunter Owen (Charlie Winter).

Ray is mentioned several times throughout 2018, as Hunter stays in contact with him. Ray arrives at local nightclub E20 as Mel is about to respond to Jack Branning's (Scott Maslen) marriage proposal. Ray tells Mel he came because Hunter told him she was in trouble, but Mel says it was a lie. Ray leaves, but Mel later calls him. They meet and talk about their past, and he says he left his job in the police because he made mistakes after she left him and that letting her go was a mistake. She says it is too late and pushes him away when he goes to kiss her, but she then kisses him. Ray spends the night with Mel and makes sure Hunter finds out, and Hunter reveals to Jack that Mel and Ray had sex. Mel tells Jack that Ray is her soulmate and he has changed, but Jack does not believe it and meets a former police colleague to find out anything bad about Ray. Ray does not turn up to a meal and makes calls in secret. After a man, Jeff, calls Ray "Simon", Hunter discovers Ray has passports in the name Simon Wright. Ray tells Hunter he is an undercover police officer but Mel cannot know about it; he gives 15-year-old Hunter alcohol without his knowledge and him drunk and in agony. Ray then cheats on Mel with a woman called Gina. Jeff tells Ray he is thinking of moving to Albert Square; Ray fails to put him off so beats him up, saying if he ever returns he will knock out his teeth. Jack and Ray agree to call a truce but after a bruised Jeff tells Jack he is pulling out of renting a flat from him and sees that he is scared of Ray, Jack tells Mel that Ray assaulted his tenant. Ray visits Jack and threatens to harm his children if he continues to talk about him to Mel. Mel soon discovers Ray is visiting a boy in hospital called Jake Wright (River Archer), and speaks to his mother, Maddie Wright (Robyn Page). Mel then asks Ray to marry her again and move in with her. Ray later claims he does not have enough money in his bank account to pay for Mel's engagement ring but she sees a receipt showing a balance of £142,878.04. Ray realises Mel saw his bank balance so tells her that he is saving up to buy E20 for her. Louise Mitchell (Tilly Keeper) develops a crush on Ray when he calls her a "beautiful woman". Ray gets a call and tells Mel he has to deal with a woman named Maddie at the police station. Mel contacts Maddie but Ray is not with her, so they meet and Mel finds out where Ray's regular pub is. Mel goes there and sees him meeting another woman, Jodie (Katie Buchholz). Mel then finds out that Jodie is Ray's daughter and he has another wife, Nicola Kelly (Alexandra Gilbreath). Nicola tells Mel and Maddie that she believes Ray murdered his first wife, Dee, and the three women agree to get revenge on Ray. Ray successfully purchases Phil Mitchell's (Steve McFadden) share of E20 by blackmailing him over his role in the death of Luke Browning (Adam Astill) and the disappearance of Vincent Hubbard (Richard Blackwood). On the day of his wedding to Mel, he talks to her about knowing Nicola, during which she reveals she knows Maddie. He then strangles her to keep her quiet and goes to the wedding. Mel recovers and goes to the wedding, much to Ray's horror. They marry and afterwards, Ray is arrested for bigamy after Nicola and Maddie go to the police. Ray later escapes from the police and attempts once again to strangle Mel to death; however, he is shot and killed by his stepson, Hunter Owen.

It was first reported on 1 July 2018 that Ray would join the series in the autumn. A show spokesperson said, "Now that Mel is settled after overcoming her initial challenges and has secured a job and built a relationship with Jack, it's time to weave in her first major storyline since her return. And it is a big one—she really shouldn't trust Ray and he will make his presence felt immediately after arriving." The character and Mahon's casting were officially confirmed on 9 July 2018. It was reported that Ray's arrival would threaten Mel's relationship with Jack. The character was described as "a serial risk-taker and expert liar" and a source said, "It's safe to say that the residents of Walford shouldn't be fooled by Ray's slick exterior—a man who thrives on danger and who cannot be trusted is lurking underneath". Mahon said of his casting, "I'm so happy to join such an incredibly hard-working and talented team and I'm very much looking forward to playing out the drama that inevitably ensues on any given day in Albert Square. My character, Ray Kelly is not one to tread lightly and his arrival to the Square will cause shockwaves for many of the residents... it doesn't get much better than that." Executive consultant John Yorke said, "Sean is both a wonderful actor and a delight to work with. His character brings to the show some very big secrets and we can't wait to watch them explode."

Zara Highway

Zara Highway, played by Faye Daveney, first appears on 10 September 2018. She is the daughter of Stuart Highway (Ricky Champ) and the niece of Callum "Halfway" Highway (Tony Clay). Zara departs in episode 5785, originally broadcast on 28 September 2018.

Zara arrives after Stuart is taken to hospital after being shot in The Queen Victoria public house. Halfway tells her that Stuart was shot in the pub, leaving Zara to believe that one of the Carters is responsible for Stuart's shooting. After Halfway accuses her of not caring about Stuart, she slaps him. Halfway persuades her to stay in Walford. Stuart alleges Mick Carter (Danny Dyer) shot him when he regains consciousness. When he makes his statement to the police, Stuart picks at his wound with a fork to cause bleeding, which she sees, but Stuart promises to Zara that Mick shot him; Zara provides Stuart with an alibi on the day Mick went to Stuart's and Stuart wanted Mick to kill him. Upon being discharged, Zara accompanies Stuart to The Queen Vic, where he offers to tell the police that Mick shot him accidentally in exchange for them to accept Mick is guilty and Zara believes Stuart. Zara is lured to The Queen Vic by Halfway in order for Mick's wife Linda Carter (Kellie Bright) to persuade her that Mick is not responsible and she visits Mick, showing her cigarette burns inflicted on her by herself due to having a childhood without Stuart present and wants him to confess. Zara begins to doubt Stuart upon being told that Linda knew Zara's mother by both her and Mick. Zara walks out on Stuart.

Daveney's casting as Zara was announced on the day of her first episode. After the episode, Justin Harp from Digital Spy called Zara "feisty and snarky from her debut scene" and reported that her quips had viewers "raving over her".

Bev Slater

Bev Slater, played by Ashley McGuire, is Hayley Slater's (Katie Jarvis) estranged mother. She first appears in the episode broadcast on 18 September 2018, and makes her final appearance in the episode broadcast on 11 January 2019.

A pregnant Hayley sees Bev and tries to avoid her, but Bev arrives at Hayley's home with flowers. Hayley sends her away but Jean Slater (Gillian Wright) convinces Hayley that Bev may be trying to make amends for the bad things she did in the past. Hayley speaks to Bev, who admits she messed up with Hayley but she wants to be a good grandmother, insisting she is not like she used to be. Bev says she works in customer relations, but later admits that she gets money through blackmailing married men when she threatens to send photos to their wives. Hayley is disgusted when Bev suggests that Hayley should scam her baby's father, who is also married, and when Hayley catches Bev going through her bag, they start to argue. Bev tells Hayley she should have aborted her baby when she had the chance, like she wishes she had done when she was pregnant with Hayley, saying that she tried to. Hayley threatens to throw a bottle at Bev, but they just insult each other. Bev leaves, and Hayley realises she is bleeding and begs Bev for help, but Bev gets in a taxi and leaves. Jean later meets Bev and tells her it is never too late to put things right but Bev simply insults Jean. Jean proclaims that Bev has no heart and tells her never to come back.

When Hayley gives birth to her daughter, Bev shows up at the hospital and takes the baby and Hayley allows it. Bev shows Hayley how to feed the baby and suggests naming her Rose but when Hayley says she cannot be a mother, Bev says they will find a family for her and make money out of the situation. Bev tells Hayley that she can get a few hundred pounds but Bev speaks to someone, agreeing a price of £100,000 to adopt the baby. Hayley’s relative, Kat Slater (Jessie Wallace) tracks them down and Bev offers her £30,000 if she goes along with the deal, but Kat reveals this to Hayley, and Kat and Hayley leave with the baby.

Bev surprises Hayley at the Slater house, revealing that she has been evicted from her flat and needs somewhere to stay. Kat’s estranged husband, Alfie Moon (Shane Richie), who unbeknown to Bev is the father of the baby, now named Cherry, does not want Bev to stay in the same house as his daughter and convinces Ian Beale (Adam Woodyatt) to let Bev stay at his house. Jean is upset when she finds out and she is angered when Kat and Stacey are nonchalant about it as long as Bev does not ruin things for Hayley. On Christmas Day, Hayley tells Bev that she wants to move back in with Bev to raise Cherry, but Bev insists that Hayley get Cherry's father involved. When Bev relates how Hayley's father was abusive and violent towards Hayley and her after Hayley was born, the revelation makes Hayley cry. Kat witnesses this and orders Bev to leave so Bev storms out of the house, insulting the entire Slater family.

Bev returns to visit Hayley and Cherry. Hayley tells her to leave, saying she is not welcome, but Bev returns the next day, admitting she was staying with a friend, and apologises for her earlier mistakes. She offers Hayley the chance to move into a potential new flat with her and Cherry, and arranges a flat-viewing later that day. When an exhausted Hayley falls asleep, Bev tries to take Cherry for a walk but Jean returns and accuses Hayley of drinking again when Bev says she is "sleeping it off". Though Hayley and Bev attempt to clear up the confusion, Jean sees sleeping pills that fall out of Bev's bag and accuses Bev of drugging Hayley and trying to sell Cherry again, which Bev denies. Bev tries to assure her her intentions are good but Jean refuses to believe her so Bev points out the times when Jean ignored her family's and Stacey's school's concerns about Stacey as a child, scaring Jean. A furious Hayley orders Bev to leave. Outside, Bev cancels the viewing, revealing that she was being genuine.

Inside Soap called Bev "a cruel, loathsome, remorseless beeyatch" and hoped she would return after her initial three-episode stint.

Cherry Slater

Cherry Slater first appears on 30 October 2018. She is the daughter of Hayley Slater (Katie Jarvis) and Alfie Moon (Shane Richie).

While Hayley is pregnant with her baby, she tells Alfie she has had an abortion and tries to conceal the pregnancy from the rest of her family, including her cousin, Alfie's estranged wife, Kat Moon (Jessie Wallace). Jean Slater (Gillian Wright) realises that Alfie is the father but agrees not to say anything. Children's services become involved when Hayley contemplates suicide. Hayley gives birth in a drugs house and passes out shortly after. They are found and the baby is healthy but Hayley takes her out of the hospital early and leaves her on the doorstep of foster carers Arshad Ahmed (Madhav Sharma) and Mariam Ahmed (Indira Joshi). When the baby vomits blood, the Ahmeds meet Hayley in the hospital where Hayley tells social worker Hilary Taylor (Sadie Shimmin) that she can look after the baby, but afterwards, Hayley's mother, Bev Slater (Ashley McGuire), takes the baby and Hayley allows it. Bev shows Hayley how to feed her baby and suggests naming her Rose but when Hayley says she cannot be a mother, Bev says they will find a family for her and make money out of the situation. Bev tells Hayley that she can get a few hundred pounds but Bev speaks to someone, agreeing a price of £100,000 to adopt the baby. Kat tracks Hayley down and Bev offers her £30,000 if she goes along with the deal, but Kat reveals this to Hayley, and Kat and Hayley leave with the baby. After Hayley tells Alfie the baby must be called Slater, not Moon, Alfie says he should be able to pick the first name, so suggests Cherry, his mother's name, and Hayley registers the birth. When both Hayley and Alfie leave Albert square, Cherry is left in Kat's care.

It was reported Hayley would have a "horror [...] ordeal" around Halloween as she will be alone as she gives birth, which is described as a "terrifying twist" and leaves Hayley "panic stricken." Hayley's anxiety also increases under the pressure of keeping the secret about the baby's paternity and her plan to "attempt to do a runner" is stopped when she goes into labour, putting her and her baby in a "worrying situation". Following the birth, Hayley, described as "struggling" and "overwhelmed", abandons her baby with Mariam and Arshad, however, her baby suffering a "scare" reportedly makes Hayley "rise to her responsibilities" and "reevaluate her earlier decision to give up her child."

Cherry made her last appearance on 19 May 2020. On 27 August 2020, it was reported that Cherry would not be returning after the show resumed filming following the COVID-19 pandemic hiatus, with her absence being explained via the show's Instagram page as Kat taking her back to Hayley prior to the lockdown.

Evie Steele

Evie Steele, played by Sophia Capasso, first appears in episode 5811, which was first broadcast on 13 November 2018. She is an acquaintance of Jagger Rawley (Aaron Thomas Ward).

Tiffany Butcher (Maisie Smith) encounters Evie in the local chicken restaurant and is immediately befriended by her. When Jagger hassles Tiffany, Evie warns him away. Tiffany bunks off school to go shopping and eating with Evie; Evie admits she is an acquaintance of Jagger's and Tiffany should do some work for them to work off a debt. Tiffany is given a gift of expensive trainers by Evie and Tiffany decides to do some work to repay Evie's kindness. When Jagger requires a place to stay for a few days, Tiffany sneaks him into Ted Murray's (Christopher Timothy) flat, however, more people show up and Tiffany discovers Evie is a drug dealer and in charge. Tiffany demands they leave and threatens to phone the police, but Evie prevents Tiffany from doing so by claiming her family do not care. After rejecting the offer to go with Evie, Jagger and Vix (Lukwesa Mwamba), Tiffany changes her mind. Tiffany visits Evie at Ted's flat to tell them that the Taylor family living above can hear them and Evie later thanks Tiffany for warning them as she prevented possible trouble with the police; Evie also assigns Tiffany another job involving drugs that requires Bernadette Taylor (Clair Norris) to go with her. Bernadette is reluctant to bunk off school with Tiffany and Evie insists Bernadette needs to go with her so Tiffany does not stand out. Tiffany reveals to Bernadette about her involvement with drugs and Tiffany convinces Bernadette to go with her when she kisses her and the following day, Evie gives Tiffany the package.

Billed as "a dangerous new friend" for Tiffany, who is a "bad girl", Evie impresses with her "boldness", which reels Tiffany in. Katie Bailie from Metro speculated if "a dangerous romance" could develop, observing  "a moment of electricity [...] in the air" and Tiffany "seems to be allowing herself to be charmed by the gang leader" in Evie's debut episodes.

Morag Morgan

Morag Morgan is played by Julia Hills. She first appears in episode 5816, first broadcast on 22 November 2018, and departs in episode 5830, first shown on 17 December 2018. She appears in eight episodes.

Morag first appears in the local shop and invites Kim Fox-Hubbard (Tameka Empson) and Honey Mitchell (Emma Barton) to join her choir, Walford Warblers, as she will be in a concert on Christmas Eve. She mentions that she once taught Lily Allen. Jean Slater (Gillian Wright) and Ian Beale (Adam Woodyatt) also join the choir. Ian leaves when he thinks Morag is flirting, because he is the only male there, but Jean convinces him to return because Morag said she knows Alan Sugar and he will be at the concert. Various other people then join after hearing there will be a £5,000 prize for the best choir. Eventually, Morag gives the solo to Jean, despite protests from Kim. However, Morag criticises Jean's imperfect performance and keeps the members practicing for over three hours, during which time, Morag also claims to know Imelda Staunton. Morag tells Jean off for answering a phone call during practice and then tells everyone their vocals were awful, so Jean defends everyone but Morag claims that she knows better than Jean because she has more experience. Kim then reveals that she has looked Morag up on the Internet and she is lying about her credentials. Jean is almost mugged before going to one choir practice and Morag criticises her further, though everyone defends her. Morag ignores them and sends Jean to sing with the background singers, so Jean leaves. Ian then calls Morag a bully and everyone agrees, and they refuse to listen to her, turning their backs on her. Morag demands that they turn around, but they ignore her, so she tells them she has washed her hands of them and leaves. Ian then takes over the choir. Following this, Jean discovers that Morag missed the deadline for entry into the Battle of the Boroughs choir competition, but the choir perform a carol concert in Albert Square on Christmas Eve.

Hills' casting in the role of Morag was reported on 13 November 2018. The character, a choir leader, was described as "larger-than-life", "a big personality" and "bossy and boastful". It was said the character would "ruffle some feathers" and get on the wrong side of other characters. She was also called "feisty" and "domineering". It was announced she would appear in "several" episodes.

Other characters

References

2018
, EastEnders
2018 in British television